Klára Csík (née Horváth, born August 5, 1947, in Kiskunhalas) is a former Hungarian handball player, World Championship silver medalist and Olympic Games bronze medalist.

Awards
 Nemzeti Bajnokság I Top Scorer: 1966, 1967

References

External links
Profile on Database Olympics

1947 births
Living people
People from Kiskunhalas
Hungarian female handball players
Handball players at the 1976 Summer Olympics
Olympic handball players of Hungary
Olympic bronze medalists for Hungary
Olympic medalists in handball
Medalists at the 1976 Summer Olympics
Sportspeople from Bács-Kiskun County